Kanchou may refer to:

Kanchou City, an older English name of Ganzhou, in Jiangxi, China.
Zhangye, Kanchow was an older English name for the city in Gansu, China.
Kancho, an act often played out in Japan.